Bruce Ramsay (born December 31, 1966) is a Canadian film, television and stage actor.

Career 
Ramsay's screen debut was opposite fellow Montrealer Elias Koteas in the film Malarek (1988). Ramsay and Koteas went on to appear in two other films together, Hit Me (1996), and Collateral Damage (2002).  Ramsay's first lead in a major motion picture came when he was cast as Carlitos Paez in director Frank Marshall's film Alive (1993), the biographical survival drama based upon Piers Paul Read's 1974 book Alive: The Story of the Andes Survivors, which detailed the story of the Uruguayan rugby team that crashed into the Andes mountains.

In 2011 Ramsay made his directorial debut with Hamlet (2011). Ramsay also produced, wrote the adaptation, and starred as Hamlet. Hamlet premiered in competition at the Vancouver International Film Festival in 2011.

Ramsay appeared as the jaded house boy Carlucci opposite Michael Douglas and Matt Damon in Behind the Candelabra (2013), directed by Steven Soderbergh, about the last ten years in the life of pianist Liberace. Behind the Candelabra marked the second time that Ramsay had worked with Soderbergh. In 1995, Ramsay appeared in The Professional Man, part of The Showtime film noir series Fallen Angels, starring opposite Peter Coyote and Brendan Fraser.

He created, wrote, starred in and produced the 2022 CBC and BET series The Porter, about the railway sleeping car porters who created North America's first Black labour union, the Brotherhood of Sleeping Car Porters.

Selected filmography 

 First Offender (1987, TV Movie)
 Pin (1988) as Teenager
 Malarek (1988) as Fred Malarek
 Jacknife (1989) as Corridor Student
 Street Legal (1991, TV Series) as Frank Travers
 Urban Angel (1991, TV Series) as Paul-Lawyer
 The Reckoning (1991, TV Movie) as Young Waiter
 To Catch a Killer (1992, TV Mini-Series) as Bragg
 Alive (1993) as Carlitos Páez
 Killing Zoe (1999) as Ricardo
 Dead Beat (1994) as Kit
 The New Age (1994) as Misha
 Blah, Blah, Blah... (1995, Short)
 Fallen Angels (1995, TV Series) as Paul
 Hellraiser: Bloodline (1996) as Phillip L'Merchant / John Merchant / Dr. Paul Merchant
 Curdled (1996) as Eduardo
 Hit Me (1996) as Del Towbridge
 Starstruck (1998) as Manny
 C-16: FBI (1998, TV Series) as Joshua Reese / Timothy Mann
 Bonanno: A Godfather's Story (1999, TV Movie) as Joseph Bonanno (Ages 17–27)
 Island of the Dead (2000) as Tony Matos
 Exploding Oedipus (2001) as Hilbert
 Shot in the Face (2001) as Jerry
 Collateral Damage (2002) as Brandt's Aide
 Looking for Jimmy (2002) as Puma
 Holes (2003) as Prosecutor
 Jericho Mansions (2003) as Eugene O'Donnell
 Timeline (2003) as ITC Tech
 Mob Princess (2003, TV Movie) as Vladimir
 Da Vinci's Inquest (2003, TV Series) as Sgt. Shaw
 Baby for Sale (2004, TV Movie) as Gabor Szabo
 Break a Leg (2005) as Other Actor at Bar
 Amnesia: The James Brighton Enigma (2005) as Carl Honeycutt
 G-Spot (2005–2009, TV Series) as Pedro Davidd / Stalker
 One Dead Indian (2006, TV Movie) as Kenneth Deane
 Veiled Truth: What Comes Around (2006, TV Movie) as Jake
 Indian Summer: The Oka Crisis (2006, TV Mini-Series) as John Parisella
 Babylon 5: The Lost Tales: Voices in the Dark (2007) as Simon Burke
 Si j'etais Toi (2007) as Daniel Harpin
 The Quality of Life (2008, TV Movie) as Earl Waverly
 Mothers & Daughters (2008) as Dinner Party Guest Bruce
 Supernatural (2010, TV Series) as Paul
 Riverworld (2010, TV Movie) as Francisco Pizarro
 Guido Superstar: The Rise of Guido (2010) as Officer Ginoble
 Doomsday Prophecy (2011, TV Movie) as Garcia
 Hamlet (2011) as Hamlet
 Behind the Candelabra (2013) as Carlucci
 Brick Mansions (2014) as Mayor
 19-2 (2014-2017, TV Series) as Commander Gendron
 Cardinal (2017, TV Series) as Ray Northwind
 The Porter (2022, TV Drama Series) as Dinger

References

External links 
 

1966 births
Living people
Canadian male film actors
Canadian male television actors
Canadian male stage actors
Male actors from Montreal